Geraldine Ulmar (June 23, 1862 – August 13, 1932) was an American singer and actress, best known for her performances in soprano roles of the Gilbert and Sullivan operas with the D'Oyly Carte Opera Company.

Life and career
Annie Geraldine Ulmar was born in Charlestown, Massachusetts.  She began singing in amateur concerts as a child.

Ideal Opera and D'Oyly Carte years

In 1879, she made her professional debut  in the role of Josephine in Gilbert and Sullivan's H.M.S. Pinafore, aboard a ship in a lake in Boston's Oakland Garden.  She soon joined the Boston Ideal Opera Company and remained with the company as leading soprano for the next six years, singing roles in The Marriage of Figaro, The Bohemian Girl, Fra Diavolo, Giralda ou La nouvelle psyché by Adolphe Adam, The Chimes of Normandy, Fatinitza, Giroflé-Girofla, Czar and Carpenter, and in Gilbert and Sullivan operas.

Ulmar next was hired to play Yum-Yum in the D'Oyly Carte Opera Company's first American production of The Mikado, at the Fifth Avenue Theatre in New York, from 1885 to 1886, in a cast that included George Thorne (Ko-Ko), Courtice Pounds (Nanki-Poo), and Fred Billington (Pooh-Bah). She joined a D'Oyly Carte touring company in England, singing Yum-Yum and Josephine for a few months, then Yum-Yum in the German company, before returning to America in the summer of 1886.  D'Oyly Carte released her to play for an American manager, John Stetson, at the end of 1886, for whom she played in Carte-approved productions in New York of Princess Ida (in the title role) and The Mikado (as Yum-Yum) and then in Boston in the title role of Patience.

In early 1887, Ulmar rejoined the D'Oyly Carte Opera Company in England, where she rehearsed the new Gilbert and Sullivan opera, Ruddygore (later renamed Ruddigore), played Rose Maybud in two matinee performances at the Savoy Theatre, and then returned to New York to play Rose in the American production. In May 1887, she returned to London to play Rose at the Savoy and remained there to play the soprano roles in the 1888 London revivals of Pinafore, The Pirates of Penzance (Mabel) and The Mikado. The Times wrote, in 1887, that 

Ulmar originated the leading soprano roles of Elsie Maynard in The Yeomen of the Guard (1888), and Gianetta in The Gondoliers (1889) before leaving D'Oyly Carte in 1890.

Later years

She remained in London to play Marton in La Cigale (1890–91) by Edmond Audran and F. C. Burnand, and next appeared as Teresa in W. S. Gilbert and Alfred Cellier's The Mountebanks (1892) and Guinevere Block in Little Christopher Columbus (1893–94). Beginning in 1896, she toured as O Mimosa San in The Geisha with George Edwardes's touring company. Her last stage role was Jane Jingle in Ladyland (1904).  Ulmar then turned to teaching singing. Some of her students became well known, including Jose Collins and Evelyn Laye.

For part of the 1890s, she was married to composer Ivan Caryll. She died in Merstham, Surrey, England, in 1932, at the age of 70.

Notes

References

External links
 Brief profile from The Theatre, 1 August 1887 August
 Photographs

1862 births
1932 deaths
19th-century American actresses
American stage actresses
American expatriate actresses in the United Kingdom
American operatic sopranos